Idol sa Kusina (International title: Kitchen Idol / ) is a Philippine television cooking show broadcast by GMA News TV. Originally hosted by Boy Logro and Bettina Carlos, it premiered on July 3, 2011. Logro and Chynna Ortaleza served as the final hosts. The show concluded on December 20, 2020.

Hosts

 Boy Logro 
 Bettina Carlos 
 Chynna Ortaleza

Production
In March 2020, the admission of a live audience in the studio and production were suspended due to the enhanced community quarantine in Luzon caused by the COVID-19 pandemic. The show resumed its programming on August 16, 2020.

Accolades

References

External links
 
 

2011 Philippine television series debuts
2020 Philippine television series endings
Filipino-language television shows
GMA News TV original programming
Philippine cooking television series
Television productions suspended due to the COVID-19 pandemic